Rideau Valley Air Park  is a registered aerodrome located  south of Kars, Ottawa, Ontario, Canada on the shore of the Rideau River. The aerodrome has a single  grass runway, and serves mainly ultralight and glider traffic.

Users
Rideau Valley Soaring is a gliding club that operates from the Kars/Rideau Valley Air park on a regular basis during the soaring season (April-October). The club members fly both private and club aircraft. The gliding club owns a Grob 103, Schleicher ASK 21 and Schweizer SGS 2-33 training gliders, plus Schweizer 1-34 and Rolladen-Schneider LS4 single-seaters. The club also has two tow planes, a Bellanca Citabria and a Piper PA-25 Pawnee.

See also 
 List of airports in the Ottawa area
 List of shortest runways

References

Registered aerodromes in Ontario
Buildings and structures in Ottawa
Transport in Ottawa